Felix Mendelssohn composed his Viola Sonata in C minor, MWV Q 14, when he was only 15 years old. The autograph score is dated 14 February 1824. The work was not published in Mendelssohn's lifetime - in fact not until 1966 - and it was not assigned an opus number. Although he did reuse one of the themes from the minuet movement in the equivalent movement of his First Symphony.

Mendelssohn himself was an accomplished violinist and violist, playing one of the viola parts in an early performance of his own String Octet in E flat major, and was fully aware of the difficulties of writing for the viola. Since the  sonata was not published for over 140 years, the first sonata specifically for the modern viola to be published may have been by Karl Ernst Naumann, who was born in 1832, after this sonata was written.

Movements 

The sonata has three movements:

 Adagio – Allegro
 Menuetto - Allegro molto
 Andante con variazioni

A typical performance lasts just under 25 minutes.

References 
Notes

Sources

External links 

Chamber music by Felix Mendelssohn
Mendelssohn
Mendelssohn
Compositions in C minor
Compositions by Felix Mendelssohn published posthumously